Carposina stationaria is a moth in the family Carposinidae. It was described by Edward Meyrick in 1928. It is found in Vanuatu on the New Hebrides.

References

Carposinidae
Moths described in 1928